Valantaravai inscription (c.13th century AD) is a medieval merchant guild inscription discovered from near Valantaravai, Ramanathapuram in Tamil Nadu in southern India. The epigraph is one of the rare records mentioning early Jewish, Christian and Muslim presence in southern India. It dates to the period of ascendancy of the Ainnutruvar or Ayyavole Five Hundred merchant guild in south India (incorporating manigramam and anjuvannam).

The record is inscribed on the four sides of a stone pillar (3 feet long and one foot wide) in Tamil language (21+14+15+[...]). The characters on the last side are illegible. The inscription (undated) can be paleographically dated to c. 1200-1250 AD. The stone pillar was originally situated on the Periyapattinam beach.

The inscription begins with the traditional invocation 'Swasti Sri' ('Hail Prosperity'). It mentions details of the land donated to certain 'Cutapalli' alias 'Ainnutruvar Perumpalli' (the 'Jewish Synagogue' alias 'the Great Synagogue of the Ainnutruvar Merchant Guild').

 On the eastern border of the donated plot, 'Valaiceri' and the 'Mutukku Vali' are located. 

 On the southern border of the donated plot, the 'garden lands' of Tirumutuccolacilai Cettiyar, 'Patinenpumi' (the Eighteen Countries) Ceyapalan and Kuttan Tevanar are located.
 On the western border of the donated plot, 'Nalunattani' (the Nanadesi) Conaccanti, Sri-cola-perunteru (street), wall or matil of the tarisapalli (the Christian church), the pilarppalli (the Muslim mosque), and the southern wall of the tarisapalli are located.

The record was discovered by P. Satish, analysed by V. Rajaguru, president, Ramanathapuram Archaeological Research Foundation, and deciphered by epigraphist S. Rajagopal. The stones from the Periyapattinam beach were brought to Valantaravai in the 1940s to construct sidewall of a well. The stone was being used for washing cloths at the time of the discovery (2022).

An undated Hebrew language inscription was previously found on a gravestone of certain Mariam, daughter of David, at Periyapattinam. The record also contained a prayer for the peace of the soul. The slab was later moved to the office of the Samsthanam Revenue officer, Ramnad. A donative record of Maravarma Sundara Pandya to the pilarpalli or the Periyapattinam Jalal Jamal Mosque can be found at the Thirupullani Temple.

See also 

 Jewish copper plates of Cochin (11th century)
 Viraraghava copper plates of Cochin (13th century)
 Quilon Syrian copper plates (9th century)

References 

13th-century inscriptions
History of Tamil Nadu
Judaic inscriptions
Cochin Jews
Saint Thomas Christians